Q42 may refer to:

Vessels 
 , a tank landing ship of the Argentine Navy
 
 Al-Rasikh, a Khareef-class corvette of the Royal Navy of Oman

Other uses
 Q42 (New York City bus)
 Ash-Shura, the 42nd surah of the Quran